Glen is a small village in County Donegal, Ireland. The focus of the townlands of Glenmenagh and Glenineeny, it is within the parish of Mevagh, and the Barony of Kilmacrenan. The village is on the crossroads between the towns of Milford, Letterkenny, Creeslough, and Carrigart. The village once supported a schoolhouse, post office and shop, as well as historically a fair. Today however, one of the few businesses left is the historic local public house, originally a shebeen and dating from the 17th century.

See also
 List of populated places in Ireland

References

Towns and villages in County Donegal